The Ultimate Fling is the first single from the album Revolution Roulette by the Finnish rock band Poets of the Fall. It was released in Finland on 6 February 2008. The single features three versions of the title track as well as a live recording of "Fire", the opening track from the band's second album Carnival of Rust. The live version was recorded during the Poets' performance at the Ankkarock Festival 2007 on 5 August 2007. The single peaked at number two in the official Finnish charts.

Track listing
  The Ultimate Fling (producer's cut) (4:23)
  The Ultimate Fling (director's cut) (7:01)
  The Ultimate Fling (The Impromptu Alternate Version) (4:43)
  Fire (Live from Ankkarock 2007) (5:16)

Charts

References

External links
The official website of Poets of the Fall
The official MySpace of Poets of the Fall (contains a full version of "The Ultimate Fling" to listen to)

2008 singles
Poets of the Fall songs
2008 songs